The Type 056 corvette (NATO reporting name: Jiangdao-class corvette) is a class of warship deployed by the Chinese People's Liberation Army Navy (PLAN). They replace older patrol craft and some of the Type 053H frigates. The first Type 056 entered service in February 2013. An anti-submarine warfare (ASW) variant, commonly known as Type 056A, has also entered service. Following construction of the Aba in December 2019, China ceased building of Type 056 corvettes to focus on procuring bigger warships for high sea missions.

Two 1,800 ton patrol variants, P18N have been delivered to Nigerian Navy and four C13B 1,300 ton corvette variants have been sold to Bangladesh Navy.

History and development
The Type 056 hull may have been based on the Pattani-class offshore patrol vessels, which were built in China for Thailand from 2005 to 2006.

The first ship was launched by Hudong-Zhonghua Shipbuilding in May 2012. In late 2012, corvettes were being produced by four Chinese shipyards.

The Type 056A were in production by late 2013. The Type 056 series was constructed at a high production rate to enhance the PLAN's littoral warfare capabilities. By February 2021, the PLAN had commissioned the last ships of the class, for a total of 22 Type 056 and 50 Type 056A. This reportedly completed the entire production run for the class.

In 2022, the PLAN transferred a batch of Type 056 to the China Coast Guard, likely the original 22 Type 056 class. As a result, the PLAN fleet shrank in 2022.

Design 

The Type 056 corvette fills the capability gap between the Type 022 missile boat and the Type 054A frigate. It is 90 metres long, displaces 1500 tons, and incorporates anti-radar features. The Type 056 is suited for mid-range green-water missions and littoral duties, but not for major blue-water combat operations; it is built with a 15-day endurance for combat missions such as patrol, escort and protection of EEZ maritime interests within  from the coast, freeing up larger warships for open ocean deployment.

Surface armament is reported as an AK-176 76 mm naval gun, two H/PJ-17 30 mm autocannons, and four YJ-83 anti-ship missiles. FL-3000N surface-to-air missiles are carried in a single eight-cell launcher. Finally, there are two triple-tube 324 mm torpedo launchers, which may carry Yu-7 light ASW torpedoes.

The basic Type 056 is equipped with Type 347G (LR66) radar and bow-mounted sonar. The Type 056A adds towed array and variable depth sonars (VDS); the towed body suggests the VDS is "not an exact copy" of either the Italian/US DE-1163 or the French DUBV-43. It is likely that the Chinese will have undertaken extensive trials and analysis of any imported equipment and built a nominally indigenous system using the knowledge gained.

The Type 056 has a helicopter deck for a Z-9-sized helicopter, but no hangar.

Variants
The P18 corvette is the export version of Type 056.

In 2014, the P18 was reportedly considered by Kazakhstan to fill a requirement for up to nine ships.

In late 2014, Argentina reportedly agreed to purchase five P18s, two to be built in China, and the remainder to be co-produced in Argentina. The ships would be called the Malvinas class, and have towed array sonar and an enlarged landing deck to handle Sea King helicopters. Each ship may cost .

Bangladesh
 
C13B is the surface warfare variant of Type 056 corvette for Bangladesh Navy. Each warship is armed with a H/PJ-26 76 mm gun, C-802A anti-ship missiles, FL-3000N SAMs and two H/PJ-17-1 30mm remote controlled gun turrets and two Type 87 ASW rocket launchers. Like the Type 056, there is a helicopter pad but no hangar.

The first batch of two corvettes was ordered from Wuchang Shipyard in Wuhan, reportedly in October 2012. The ships were laid down on 8 January 2013. Shadhinota (F111), the lead ship, was launched on 30 November 2014. The second ship, Prottoy (F112) was launched on 30 December 2014. Shadhinota and Prottoy were commissioned on 19 March 2016.

The second batch of two corvettes was ordered on 21 July 2015 to the Chinese shipyard. Construction of the ships began on 9 August 2016. The third ship of the class, Sangram (F113), was launched on 12 February 2018. The fourth ship of the class, Prottasha (F114) was launched on 8 April 2018. Bangladesh Navy has received the final two corvettes, Sangram and Prottasha. The corvettes were handed over to the service on 28 March and arrived at the naval base in Chittagong on 27 April 2019, said ISPR. According to Jane's 360, the latest two appear to be equipped with a more advanced phased-array radar unlike the first two ships of the class.

Nigeria
The P18N offshore patrol vessel (OPV) is the variant operated by the Nigerian Navy. It has a crew of 75. Armament is reportedly a single NG-16-1 76 mm gun with a TR47 fire-control radar, two 30 mm guns, and two 20 mm guns. The class has an Oil Support Recovery System to combat oil spills. Unlike the Type 056, the P18N has a helicopter hangar.

Nigeria ordered two P18Ns from CSOC in April 2012 for  each. The first was slated to be completed in China, with the final 50–70% of the second being completed at the Nigerian Naval Shipyard in Port Harcourt; CSOC was contracted to upgrade the shipyard to facilitate this.

NNS Centenary (F91), the first P18N, was built at the Wuchang Shipyard in Wuhan. It was launched January 2014 and completed trials in October 2014. Centenary left China in December 2014 and arrived in Lagos, Nigeria in February 2015; it was commissioned the same month. Delivery was originally expected in mid-2014.

The second OPV, NNS Unity (F92), was reported in February 2015 to be undergoing outfitting at Wuchang, and was expected to be delivered in 2015. Nigeria had originally expected to receive it in mid-2014 for completion at Port Harcourt. The ship was delivered on 4 November 2016 to the Nigerian Navy in Lagos.  NNS Unity was commissioned on 15 December 2016. In January 2017 the vessel was deployed to The Gambia in a "show of strength" as part of an ECOWAS sponsored intervention in the 2016–17 Gambian constitutional crisis.

Algeria
The Stockholm International Peace Research Institute (SIPRI) reported that Algeria ordered a 96-metre "OPV/frigate" in 2020; SIPRI provisionally listed the class as "Pattani".

According to social media the ship is an export derivative of the Type 056 and was launched by August 2021.

China Coast Guard variant
A Type 056 variant for the China Coast Guard was under construction at Huangpu in late-2014. The forward superstructure was moved back to make for a raised structure ahead of the bridge. Large davits were installed ahead of the flight deck on both sides of the ships. It is not expected to be armed with the 76 mm. gun, missiles, or other weapon systems. 

In 2022, China also transferred 22 original Type 056 variant to the China Coast Guard.

Ships in class

See also

Ships of comparable role, configuration, and era

Project 22160 patrol ship

Related lists
List of active People's Liberation Army Navy ships

References

Corvette classes
Corvettes of the People's Liberation Army Navy